Cheer is a laundry detergent sold in the United States and Canada. It is manufactured by Procter & Gamble.

It was introduced in 1950, and after a slight reformulation in 1952, was a highly successful follow up to P&G's Tide product from 1948 to 1949.

Cheer is recognized for its distinctive blue granules, which formerly gave it the nickname "Blue Cheer". The 1952 formula ("Blue-Magic Whitener") was designed to clean as well as perform bluing, which makes white clothing look whiter (this was traditionally a separate process).  Magazine and television ads at the time proclaimed, "...washes clothes so clean, so white, you don't need bluing or bleach!" This was well known as a sponsor of I Love Lucy. Kinescopes exist of 1950s soap opera episodes with commercials for Cheer still intact, it being a sponsor of shows like The Brighter Day.

In the 1960s, the brand was repositioned as "All Temperature Cheer" or as it was also known, "All-Tempa-Cheer", as it was said to be formulated to clean clothes effectively in all water temperatures.

As of July 2016 Cheer detergent is still being sold, albeit as a budget detergent. Tide Plus Colorguard replaced Cheer as the premium color care detergent. The brand is currently known as "Cheer Colorguard" and "Cheer Brightclean."

The brand was the Jerry Seinfeld character's favorite type of detergent on the show Seinfeld, as seen in the episode "The Sponge". As "Blue Cheer", the brand also gave its name to a variety of LSD produced by San Francisco chemist Owsley Stanley, and the band Blue Cheer was most likely named after the variety of LSD.

References

External links 
 

Procter & Gamble brands
Laundry detergents
Products introduced in 1950
Cleaning product brands